Liu Jing (born 3 February 1971) is a retired Chinese middle distance runner who specialized in the 800 and 1500 metres.

In the 800 metres she won the silver medal at the 1998 Asian Championships. In the 1500 metres event she won the gold medal at the 1998 Asian Championships. She was qualified for the 1998 World Cup, but did not actually compete.

Her personal best 800 m time was 1.58.55 minutes, achieved in October 1997 in Shanghai. Her personal best 1500 m time was 3:57.03 minutes, achieved in the same time and place.

In September 1998, Liu was found guilty of doping during the National Championships in Beijing. She was stripped of the silver medal she had won.

Achievements

References

1971 births
Doping cases in athletics
Chinese sportspeople in doping cases
Living people
Chinese female middle-distance runners
20th-century Chinese women